William Edward Haydock (born 19 January 1936) is an English former footballer who played as a winger in the Football League for Manchester City, Crewe Alexandra, Grimsby Town, Stockport County and Southport. He managed Macclesfield Town from the start of the 1972–73 season until January 1974.

References

1936 births
Living people
Footballers from Salford
English footballers
Association football wingers
Buxton F.C. players
Manchester City F.C. players
Crewe Alexandra F.C. players
Grimsby Town F.C. players
Stockport County F.C. players
Port Elizabeth City F.C. players
Southport F.C. players
Macclesfield Town F.C. players
English Football League players
English football managers
Macclesfield Town F.C. managers